Rietkol is a town in Victor Khanye Local Municipality in the Mpumalanga province of South Africa.

References

Populated places in the Victor Khanye Local Municipality